Abdul Buhari (born 26 June 1982) is a British athlete who competes in the discus throw. He was born in Nigeria.

Education
Buhari was educated at two state schools in London: at Millbank Primary School, a state primary school in the London Borough of the City of Westminster, and the London Nautical School, a selective boys' state secondary school in the London Borough of Lambeth.

Athletics career
Buhari is a member of the Newham and Essex Beagles club and is coached by Mark Wiseman. He works two days a week in the City of London, in operations support for investment bank Credit Suisse and spends the rest of the week training in Loughborough.

Buhari missed the 2010 Commonwealth Games due to injury.

Buhari represented Great Britain and Northern Ireland at the 2012 European Athletics Championships in Helsinki, Finland, but failed to reach the discus final.

Buhari was selected to compete for Great Britain at the 2012 Summer Olympics in the men's discus alongside compatriots Lawrence Okoye and Brett Morse. The event was held at the Olympic Stadium on 6–7 August and Buhari finished in 29th, missing out on the final.

References

External links
 
 
 

1982 births
Living people
British male discus throwers
Nigerian male discus throwers
Olympic athletes of Great Britain
Athletes (track and field) at the 2012 Summer Olympics
World Athletics Championships athletes for Great Britain
Nigerian emigrants to the United Kingdom